Nvidia Ion was a product line of Nvidia Corporation intended for motherboards of low-cost portable computers. It used graphics processing units and chipsets intended for small products.

Description
Nvidia Ion products included a GeForce 9M (9xxxM) series MCP79MX (with integrated GeForce 9400M G GPU) chipset, DDR3-1066 or DDR2-800 SDRAM, and the Intel Atom processor. The original reference platform was based on a Pico-ITXe motherboard designed for netbook and nettop devices. 
In February 2009, Microsoft certified the Ion-based platform for Windows Vista.  The small form factor Ion-based computers were released in mid-2009.

Ion GPUs are DirectX 10.0 and OpenGL 3.3 compliant. They also support CUDA and OpenCL. They can play 1080p H.264, MPEG-2 and VC-1 video using VDPAU or PureVideo HD. ION-LE–based systems shared the same basic hardware as ION but lack Vista and DirectX 10 support.

Nvidia announced that it would release the Ion platform for the VIA Nano processor some time in Q4 2009.

Specifications

Ion (first-generation Nvidia Ion)

 Chipset: MCP79MX (with integrated GeForce 9400M GPU)
 Intended Operating System: (Ion): Microsoft Windows XP, Vista, Windows 7, Linux; (Ion-LE): Microsoft Windows XP, Linux, MacBook 
 Memory Interface: DDR3-1066 or DDR2-800
 DirectX 10 Support: Yes, No (Ion-LE)
 Graphics Cores: 16
 Core/Shader Clocks: 450/1100 MHz
 Texture Fill Rate: 3.6 Billion/second
 Maximum Anti-Aliasing (AA) Sample Rate: 16x
 RAMDACs: 300 MHz
 Maximum High-Dynamic Range (HDR) Precision: 128-bit
 Maximum Analog Resolution: 2048 x 1536
 Maximum Digital Resolution: 2560 x 1600
 Graphics APIs: DirectX 10.0, OpenGL 3.3
 Full HD decode (1080i/p): Yes, 3rd Generation PureVideo
 Display Options: HDMI, Dual-link DVI, DP, or VGA (any 2)
 HDMI Version: 1.8 (according to the manual of the zotac ION itx-f board)
 PCI-Express 2.0: 20 lanes (1×16 and 4×1)
 SATA Drives: 6
 SATA Speed: 3 Gbit/s
 RAID: 0, 1
 Networking: 10/100/1000 BASE-T
 USB Ports: 12/2C
 PCI Slots: 5
 Audio: HDA (Azalia)

Ion 2 (next-generation Nvidia Ion)
 CUDA cores: up to 16
 Standard Memory configurations: 512 MB of DDR2, 256 MB of DDR3, 512 MB of DDR3
 Memory Interface Width: Up to 64-bit
 Hardware Video Decode Acceleration: Yes, 4th Generation PureVideo
 nVidia CUDA Technology: Yes
 Certified for Windows 7: Yes
 Microsoft DirectX: 10.1
 OpenGL: 3.3
 Audio: HDA
 Maximum digital resolution: 2560 × 1600
 Maximum VGA resolution: 2048 × 1536
 Netbook supported display connectors: HDMI
 Desktop supported display connectors: Dual-link DVI, DisplayPort, HDMI, VGA
 Multi-monitor: Yes
 HDCP: Yes

Motherboards

 ASRock A330ION motherboard (Intel Atom 330 CPU, DDR3, PCI Express x16 slot)
 ASUS AT5IONT-I motherboard (Intel Atom D525 CPU, DDR3, USB3, PCI Express x4 slot @ x1 speed, with latch)
 ASUS AT3N7A-I motherboard (Intel Atom 330 CPU)
 ASUS AT3IONT-I motherboard (Intel Atom 330 CPU, DDR3, PCI Express x16 slot)
 ASUS AT3IONT-I DELUXE motherboard (Intel Atom 330 CPU, DDR3, PCI Express x16 slot, DC power connector, 802.11n WiFi and Bluetooth, Media remote)
 IEI Industrial Motherboard KINO-PVN D5251 ION2, DDR3, HDMI, Dual GbE, SATA, PCI/ PCI Expr.x1 slot, mini-PCI, CF TypeII
 Jetway NC63-230 ITX board (Intel Atom 230 CPU, 20-pin ATX power connector)
 Jetway NC63-330 ITX board (Intel Atom 330 CPU, 20-pin ATX power connector)
 Jetway NC63P-230 ITX board (Intel Atom 230 CPU, 12V DC Power Onboard)
 Jetway NC63P-330 ITX board (Intel Atom 330 CPU, 12V DC Power Onboard)
 Point of View POV/ION230 motherboard (Intel Atom 230 CPU)
 Point of View POV/ION330 motherboard (Intel Atom 330 CPU)
 ZOTAC IONITX A-B motherboard (Intel Atom 330 CPU, 90w DC power connector, Wireless PCIe module installed)
 ZOTAC IONITX A-U motherboard (Intel Atom 330 CPU, DC power connector, Wireless PCIe module installed)
 ZOTAC IONITX B-E motherboard (Intel Atom 230 CPU, 20-pin power connector)
 ZOTAC IONITX C-U motherboard (Intel Atom 230 CPU, DC power connector)
 ZOTAC IONITX D-E motherboard (Intel Atom 330 CPU, 20-pin power connector, Wireless PCIe module installed)
 ZOTAC IONITX F-E motherboard (Intel Atom 330 CPU, 20-pin power connector, Wireless PCIe module installed, PCI Express x16 slot)
 ZOTAC IONITX G-E motherboard (Intel Atom 330 CPU, 20-pin power connector, PCI Express x1 slot, mini-PCIe x1 slot)
 ZOTAC IONITX N-E motherboard (Intel Celeron 743 CPU, 20-pin power connector, Wireless PCIe module installed, PCI Express x16 slot)
 ZOTAC IONITX P-E motherboard (Intel Celeron SU2300 CPU, 20-pin power connector, Wireless PCIe module installed, PCI Express x16 slot)

Desktop systems

 Acer AspireRevo Nettop Media Server w/Remote
 Aleutia H1 Hotel PC (with the above ZOTAC IONITX A-U), fanless in the single core version.
 aOpen GP7A
 ASRock Ion 330 series
 ASRock Ion 330HT series w/Remote
 ASRock Ion 330Pro
 ASUS Eee Box EB1012U (ION 1)
 ASUS Eee Box EB1012P (ION 2)
 ASUS Eee Box EB1501
 Asus S1-AT5NM10E
 Foxconn NetBox-nT330i 
 Giada Mini PC series 
 Lenovo IdeaCentre Q150 - 40816AU 
 MSi All-in-One PC Wind Top AE2220
 Myka ION
 Orbit Micro Helix A58 Sleek NVIDIA ION/N330 desktop system
 Orbit Micro Helix A5W Fanless IP waterproof dustproof Nvidia ION system
 Sapphire EDGE HD
 Shuttle XS35GT, fanless system with ION2 and Atom D510
 Viewsonic VOT132 
 ZaReason Ion Breeze
 Zotac Mag

Netbook systems
 Acer Aspire One 532G
 Asus Eee PC VX6
 Asus Eee PC 1015PN
 Asus Eee PC 1201N
 Asus Eee PC 1201NL (Only graphics component attached to Intel motherboard.
 Asus Eee PC 1215N
 HP Mini 311
 Lenovo IdeaPad S12
 Point of View Mobii ION
 Samsung N510

Discontinued Windows support 

NVIDIA has ceased Windows driver support for Nvidia ION series on April 1, 2016.

 Windows XP 32-bit & Media Center Edition: version 340.52 (WHQL) released on July 29, 2014; Download
 Windows XP 64-bit: version 340.52 (WHQL) released on July 29, 2014; Download
 Windows Vista, 7, 8, 8.1 32-bit: version 342.01 (WHQL) released on December 14, 2016; Download
 Windows Vista, 7, 8, 8.1 64-bit: version 342.01 (WHQL) released on December 14, 2016; Download
 Windows 10, 32-bit: version 342.01 (WHQL) released on December 14, 2016; Download
 Windows 10, 64-bit: version 342.01 (WHQL) released on December 14, 2016; Download

See also
 Comparison of Nvidia graphics processing units
 Tegra

References

External links
 NVIDIA's official overview page on the NVIDIA ION platform
 AnandTech: NVIDIA's Ion Platform: Bringing High Def to Netbooks
 bit-tech.net - Nvidia Ion Platform: Atom gets GeForce
 Techgage: NVIDIA's ION Platform: Hands-On Impressions
 X-bit labs: Nvidia ION Platform: HD Video Playback Investigation
 LinuxTECH.NET: Independent overview of all currently available Nvidia ION-based products

Ion